Gu Gu is a male giant panda at the Beijing Zoo, born on 25 September 1999 at the Wolong National Nature Reserve.  He has received international attention for incidents in which he attacked zoo visitors who trespassed into his enclosure.

First incident
On September 19, 2006, six year old Gu Gu bit a drunk Chinese man who had jumped into his enclosure and tried to hug him.  Zhang Xinyan, a migrant worker from the central Henan province, had drunk several beers before arriving at the zoo.  He cleared the railing around the enclosure, managed to approach the panda undetected, and moved to hug him. The bear bit Zhang on both legs.  In an attempt to stop the attack, Zhang said that he "...bit the panda on its back but its fur was too thick."  Zoo officials sedated Gu Gu by spraying him with water. Zhang was hospitalized after the incident. The zoo reported that besides a one-and-a-half-day loss of appetite, Gu Gu was unharmed.

Second incident
A second incident occurred on Tuesday October 23, 2007, when 15-year-old Li Xitao jumped the barrier and climbed into the panda exercise area where Gu Gu and another bear were being fed.  He startled the 240-pound panda, who reacted by biting the boy on both legs, ripping chunks from both of them.  Li, who was from Hebei province in northeast China and made a living in Beijing selling recyclables found on the street, had climbed into the panda enclosure out of "curiosity".  According to medical officials, Li was so viciously attacked that his bones were showing, and chunks of flesh were left behind in the ambulance.  The attack was reported by witnesses to have lasted 3 to 4 minutes.  Li was taken to the Beijing Children's Hospital.  A zoo official named Zhang was quoted as saying "We have to prepare against such behavior," and that visitors should "act properly when visiting and love the animals."  Zoo officials were reportedly considering unspecified measures to prevent further incidents.  However, Zhang stated that the barrier around the exercise area couldn't be any taller because it would block the view of the pandas.

Third incident
On January 7, 2009, Gu Gu again made international headlines when he attacked a zoo visitor who climbed over the barrier into his pen to retrieve a toy dropped by his son. Zhang Jiao of central Anhui province, like the previous two trespassers, sustained bite injuries to his legs and was hospitalized, where he had surgery for damage to major ligaments.  According to witnesses, Zhang appeared to first look around to see if pandas were nearby before jumping in to get his 5-year-old son's toy. Zoo workers were forced to use tools to pry Gu Gu's jaws apart when he wouldn't let go of Zhang's legs. The repeated incidents involving the panda resulted in CNN describing Gu Gu as "not your typical soft and cuddly giant panda".

See also
 List of giant pandas

References

Individual giant pandas
Individual animals in China
1999 animal births